World Diabetes Day is the primary global awareness campaign focusing on diabetes mellitus and is held on 14 November each year.

It was led by the International Diabetes Federation (IDF), each World Diabetes Day focuses on a theme related to diabetes; type-2 diabetes is largely preventable and treatable non-communicable disease that is rapidly increasing in numbers worldwide. Type 1 diabetes is not preventable but can be managed with insulin injections. Topics covered have included diabetes and human rights, diabetes and lifestyle, diabetes and obesity, diabetes in the disadvantaged and the vulnerable, and diabetes in children and adolescents. While the campaigns last the whole year, the day itself marks the birthday of Frederick Banting who, along with Charles Best, first conceived the idea which led to the discovery of insulin in 1922.

History

World Diabetes Day was launched in 1991 by the International Diabetes Federation and the World Health Organization (WHO) in response to the rapid rise of diabetes around the world.

By 2016, World Diabetes Day was being commemorated by over 230 IDF member associations in more than 160 countries and territories, as well as by other organizations, companies, healthcare professionals, politicians, celebrities, and people living with diabetes and their families. Activities include diabetes screening programmes, radio and television campaigns, sports events and others.

Themes

Themes of previous World Diabetes Day campaigns have focused on different factors that influence the risk of diabetes and its complications:
 2013: Protect our Future: Diabetes Education and Prevention.
 2014: Go Blue for Breakfast.
 2015: Healthy Eating.
 2016: Eyes on Diabetes.
 2017: Women and diabetes – our right to a healthy future.
 2018–2019: The Family and Diabetes – diabetes concerns every family.
 2020: The Nurse and Diabetes.
 2021–2023: Access to Diabetes Care.

See also
 St. Vincent Declaration
 Epidemiology of diabetes mellitus
 World Health Day 2016: Beat Diabetes (WHO)

References

External links 
 World Diabetes Day
 World Diabetes Day programme 2020

Diabetes
Diabetes
November observances